Seaton can refer to:

Places

Antarctica
 Seaton Glacier

Australia
 Seaton, South Australia
 Seaton, Victoria

Canada
 Seaton, Ontario
 Seaton House, one of the largest men's homeless shelters located in Toronto, Ontario

England
 Seaton, Cornwall
 Seaton, Cumbria
 Seaton, Devon
 Seaton, County Durham
 Seaton Carew, County Durham
 Seaton Burn, Tyne and Wear
 Seaton Delaval, Northumberland
 Seaton Sluice, Northumberland
 Seaton Valley, Northumberland
 Seaton, Rutland
 Seaton, East Riding of Yorkshire
 Seaton Ross, East Riding of Yorkshire

Scotland
 Seaton Park, Aberdeen

United States
 Seaton, Illinois

People 
 Alexander Seaton (1626–1649), Scottish soldier
 Andy Seaton (born 1977), Scottish footballer
 Brad Seaton (born 1993), American football player
 Fred Andrew Seaton (1909–1974), United States Secretary of the Interior, 1956–1961
 George Seaton (1911–1979), American playwright and film director
 Gordon Seaton (born 1945), Scottish footballer
 M. J. Seaton (1923–2007), British physicist
 Thomas Seaton (1684–1781), British clergyman and benefactor
 Thomas Seaton Scott (1826–1895), British-born Canadian architect
 Seaton Schroeder (1849–1922), American admiral

Railway stations 
 Seaton railway station (Cornwall), England
 Seaton (Cumbria) railway station, England
 Seaton (Devon) railway station, England
 Seaton railway station (Rutland), England
 Seaton Junction railway station, in Devon, England
 Seaton Park railway station, in Adelaide, Australia

Other 
 Seaton (South Boston, Virginia), U.S., a historic house
 Baron Seaton, a British title
 Seaton's, a boarding house of Upper Canada College, Toronto

See also 
 Seton (disambiguation)